Frank Atwood Richardson (1898–1962) was an American film director and screenwriter. In the 1920s and 1930s he worked in Britain, directing several quota quickies including Don't Be a Dummy (1932).

Selected filmography
 The White Hen (1921)
 King of the Pack (1926)
 Racing Blood (1926)
 The River House Ghost (1932)
 Don't Be a Dummy (1932)
 Above Rubies (1932)
 Double Wedding (1933)
 The Avenging Hand (1937)
 That's the Ticket (1940)
 Bait (1950)

References

Bibliography
Low, Rachael. Filmmaking in 1930s Britain. George Allen & Unwin, 1985.

External links

1898 births
1962 deaths
American male screenwriters
American film directors
British male screenwriters
British film directors
British film producers
American expatriates in the United Kingdom
20th-century American male writers
20th-century American screenwriters
20th-century British screenwriters